Smiling Kelly is the third album released by Singaporean singer Kelly Poon. 
It was released on October 22, 2008 in Taiwan and November 7, 2008 in Singapore.

Track listing 
 本小姐不爱
 爱我100分钟
 限时的遗忘
 告白
 勇敢温柔
 闪光俱乐部
 微笑超能力少女
 爱呀爱呀
 维多利亚的爱
 春去春又回

2008 albums
Kelly Poon albums